is a Japanese voice actor, narrator and sound director affiliated with OGIPRO THE NEXT Co. Inc.. He is part of a three-man comedy team called .

Filmography

Anime television series
1980s
Armored Trooper Votoms (1983) (Chirico Cuvie)
1990s
Rurouni Kenshin (1996) (Lorenzo Shōzō)
Blue Submarine 6 (1998) (Hayami Tetsu)
Beast Wars II (1998) (Lio Convoy)
Beast Wars Neo (1999) (Lio Convoy)
Hunter × Hunter (1999) (Leorio)
2000s
Yu-Gi-Oh! Duel Monsters (2000) (Jean Claude Magnum)
Prince of Tennis (2001) (Mamoru Inoue)
King of Bandit Jing (2002) (Campari)
Last Exile (2003) (Vincent Alzey)
R.O.D the TV (2003) (Joe "Joker" Carpenter)
Zatch Bell! (2003) (Kafka Sunbeam)
Battle B-Daman (2004) (Shin)
Shura no Toki (2004) (Izumi Mutsu)
Yu-Gi-Oh! Duel Monsters GX (2004) (Mr. T/Trueman, Darkness)
Full Metal Panic! The Second Raid (2005) (Vincent Blueno)
Ginga Densetsu Weed (2005) (Tokimune)
Zettai Shōnen (2005) (Jirō Hatori)
Akubi Girl (2006) (Narration)
Digimon Savers (2006) (Daimon Suguru)
D.Gray-Man (2007) (Suman Dark)
Dragonaut -The Resonance- (2007) (Kasuga Nozaki)
Junjou Romantica (2008) (Ijuuin Kyō)
Strike Witches (2008) (Ichirou Miyafuji, Narrator)
The Tower of Druaga: the Aegis of Uruk (2008) (Melt)
Vampire Knight (2008) (Headmaster Cross)
Axis Powers Hetalia (2009) (Roma Antiqua/Roman Empire)
Metal Fight Beyblade (2009) (Hokuto)
2010s
Strike Witches 2 (2010) (Ichirou Miyafuji, Narrator)
Akame ga Kill (2014) (Budo)
Majin Bone (2014) (Dragon Bone)
Luck & Logic (2016) (Utsutsuno Jarno)
Battery (2016) (Makoto Tomura)
One Piece (2017) (Nefertari Cobra)
Altair: A Record of Battles (2017) (Yüz-Maske Selim )
Beyblade Burst God (2017) (Alexander Gilten / Ashtem)
Kokkoku: Moment by Moment (2018) (Junji Sagawa)
Welcome to Demon School! Iruma-kun (2019) (Narration)
2020s
Dorohedoro (2020) (Asu)
Gibiate (2020) (Guren Soshigaya)
Healin' Good Pretty Cure (2020–2021) (King Byogen, Sarlow)
Transformers War for Cybertron Trilogy (2020-2021) (Ratchet)
Isekai Shōkan wa Nidome Desu (2023) (King Distinia)

Original video animations
Armored Trooper Votoms (1985) (Chirico Cuvie)
Legend of the Galactic Heroes Gaiden (1998) (Yang Wen-li)
Read or Die (2001) (Joker)
Hunter × Hunter (2002) (Leorio)
Interlude (2004) (Ikuo Fuyuki)

Anime films
Doraemon: Nobita and the Castle of the Undersea Devil (1983) (Announcer)
Beast Wars II (1998) (Lio Convoy)
Oshare Majo Love and Berry: Shiwase no Mahou (2007) (Mr. Blad)
Cyborg 009 Vs. Devilman (2015) (Great Britain/007)

Tokusatsu
Gosei Sentai Dairanger (1993) (Fast-Talking Player (voice of human form) (ep. 29–30))

Game
Interlude (2003) (Ikuo Fuyuki)
Everybody's Golf 4 (2003) (Falcon)
Tales of Hearts (2008) (Kunzite)
Tekken 6 (2009) (Tougou)
Super Robot Wars series (2011–present) (Chirico Cuvie)

Musical
Musical Hunter × Hunter (2000) (Leorio, Mr.Gozumi)
Hunter × Hunter: Dejavu in Summer (2001) (Leorio, Mr.Gozumi)
Hunter × Hunter: The Nightmare of Zaoldyeck (2002) (Leorio)

Drama CDs
Yasashikute Toge ga Aru (Kippei Asakura)
Antique Bakery (Yusuke Ono)

Dubbing

Live-action
David Thewlis
Harry Potter and the Prisoner of Azkaban (2004) (Remus Lupin)
Harry Potter and the Order of the Phoenix (2007) (Remus Lupin)
Harry Potter and the Half-Blood Prince (2009) (Remus Lupin)
Harry Potter and the Deathly Hallows – Part 1 (2010) (Remus Lupin)
Harry Potter and the Deathly Hallows – Part 2 (2011) (Remus Lupin)
The Affair of the Necklace (Nicholas de Lamotte (Adrien Brody))
Alice Through the Looking Glass (Wilkins (Matt Vogel))
Alien: The Director's Cut (Captain Dallas (Tom Skerritt))
Ally McBeal (Larry Paul (Robert Downey Jr.))
And Then There Were None (Doctor Edward Armstrong (Toby Stephens))
Birth of the Dragon (Wong Jack Man (Xia Yu))
Bridesmaids (Officer Nathan Rhodes (Chris O'Dowd))
Desperate Housewives (Tom Scavo (Doug Savant))
Grace of Monaco (Rainier III (Tim Roth))
Hannibal (Netflix edition) (Paul Krendler (Ray Liotta))
High Crimes (Tom Kubik (Jim Caviezel))
Hope Springs (Dr. Bernie Feld (Steve Carell))
I Am Sam (2005 NTV edition) (Mr. Turner (Richard Schiff))
Mad Max 2 (2015 Supercharger edition) (Pappagallo (Michael Preston))
The Martian (Theodore "Teddy" Sanders (Jeff Daniels))
The Mentalist (Patrick Jane (Simon Baker))
The Monuments Men (Lt. Frank Stokes (George Clooney))
Norman: The Moderate Rise and Tragic Fall of a New York Fixer (Micha Eshel (Lior Ashkenazi))
Steve Jobs (John Sculley (Jeff Daniels))

Animation
Brave (Lord MacInstosh)
Elias: The Little Rescue Boat (Smacky)
Epic (Mandrake)

References

External links
Hozumi Gōda at YMO 
Hozumi Gouda at Group TAC 
Hozumi Gouda at Shonan Actors School 

1957 births
Living people
Japanese comedians
Japanese male musical theatre actors
Japanese male video game actors
Japanese male voice actors
Male voice actors from Tokyo
Japanese voice directors
20th-century Japanese male actors
21st-century Japanese male actors